Muna (Pulau Muna) is an island in the Southeast Sulawesi province of Indonesia with an area of  and had a population of 316,293 at the 2010 Census and 368,654 at the 2020 Census. It is just southeast of the island of Sulawesi and west of Buton Island. It currently comprises most of three administrative regencies within the province:  Muna Regency (Kabupaten Muna), West Muna Regency (Kabupaten Muna Barat), and Central Buton Regency (Kabupaten Buton Tengah).

References

Islands of Sulawesi
Landforms of Southeast Sulawesi
Populated places in Indonesia